Holger-Madsen (11 April 1878 – 30 November 1943) was a Danish film director, actor and screenwriter. He directed more than 40 films between 1912 and 1936. He also appeared in more than 20 films between 1908 and 1935.

Selected filmography

 Kun en Tigger (1912)
 Ned med Vaabnene (1913)
 Pax aeterna (1917)
 A Trip to Mars (1918)
 Towards the Light (1919)
 Judge Not (1920)
 Zaida, the Tragedy of a Model (1923)
 The Evangelist (1924)
 The Man at Midnight (1924)
 An Artist of Life (1925)
 Lace (1926)
 The Holy Lie (1927)
 The Sporck Battalion (1927)
 Fair Game (1928)
 The Strange Night of Helga Wangen (1928)
 What's Wrong with Nanette? (1929)
 Præsten i Vejlby (1931)
 København, Kalundborg og - ? (1934)
 Kidnapped (1935)
 Sun Over Denmark (1936)

References

External links

1878 births
1943 deaths
Danish male film actors
Danish male silent film actors
20th-century Danish male actors
Danish male screenwriters
Male actors from Copenhagen
Film directors from Copenhagen
20th-century screenwriters